William Gibbs McAdoo Jr.  (October 31, 1863 – February 1, 1941) was an American lawyer and statesman. McAdoo was a leader of the Progressive movement and played a major role in the administration of his father-in-law President Woodrow Wilson. A member of the Democratic Party, he also represented California in the United States Senate.

Born in Marietta, Georgia, McAdoo moved to Knoxville, Tennessee, in his youth and graduated from the University of Tennessee. He established a legal practice in Chattanooga, Tennessee, before moving to New York City in 1892. He gained fame as the president of the Hudson and Manhattan Railroad Company and served as the vice chairman of the Democratic National Committee. McAdoo worked on Wilson's successful 1912 presidential campaign and served as the United States Secretary of the Treasury from 1913 to 1918. He married Wilson's daughter, Eleanor, in 1914. McAdoo presided over the establishment of the Federal Reserve System and helped prevent an economic crisis after the outbreak of World War I. After the U.S. entered the war, McAdoo also served as the Director General of Railroads. McAdoo left Wilson's Cabinet in 1919, co-founding the law firm of McAdoo, Cotton & Franklin.

McAdoo sought the Democratic presidential nomination at the 1920 Democratic National Convention but was opposed by his father-in-law, President Woodrow Wilson, who hoped to be nominated for a third term. In 1922, McAdoo left his law firm and moved to California. He sought the Democratic presidential nomination again in 1924, but the 1924 Democratic National Convention nominated John W. Davis. He was elected to the Senate in 1932 but was defeated in his bid for a second term. McAdoo died of a heart attack in 1941 while traveling from the third inauguration of Franklin D. Roosevelt.

Early life and career
McAdoo was born during the middle of the Civil War in the historic William Gibbs McAdoo House in Marietta, Georgia. He was the son of author Mary Faith Floyd (1832–1913) and attorney William Gibbs McAdoo (1820–1894). His uncle, John David McAdoo, was a Confederate general and a justice of the Texas Supreme Court. McAdoo attended rural schools until his family moved to Knoxville, Tennessee, in 1877, when his father became a professor at the University of Tennessee.

He graduated from the University of Tennessee and was a member of the Lambda chapter of Kappa Sigma fraternity. He was appointed deputy clerk of the United States District Court for the Eastern District of Tennessee in 1882. He married his first wife, Sarah Hazelhurst Fleming, on November 18, 1885. They had seven children: Harriet Floyd McAdoo, Francis Huger McAdoo, Julia Hazelhurst McAdoo, Nona Hazelhurst McAdoo, William Gibbs McAdoo III, Robert Hazelhurst McAdoo, and Sarah Fleming McAdoo.

He was admitted to the bar in Tennessee in 1885 and set up a practice in Chattanooga, Tennessee. In the early 1890s, he lost most of his money trying to electrify the Knoxville Street Railroad system. In 1892 he moved to New York City, where he met Francis R. Pemberton, son of the Confederate General John C. Pemberton. They formed a firm, Pemberton and McAdoo, to sell investment securities.

In 1895, McAdoo returned to Knoxville and regained control of part of his bankrupt streetcar company, which had been auctioned off. In subsequent months, he engaged in a struggle with Ohio businessman C.C. Howell over control of the city's streetcar system, culminating in a bizarre incident known as the Battle of Depot Street. Litigation in the aftermath of this incident favored Howell, and McAdoo abandoned his streetcar endeavors in 1897 and returned to New York.

Around 1900, McAdoo took on the leadership of a project to build the Uptown Hudson Tubes, a pair of railroad tunnels under the Hudson River connecting Manhattan with New Jersey. A tunnel had been partially constructed during the 1880s by Dewitt Clinton Haskin. With McAdoo as president of the Hudson and Manhattan Railroad Company, two passenger tubes were completed and opened in 1908. The popular McAdoo told the press that his motto was "Let the Public be Pleased." The tunnels are now part of the PATH train system.

His first wife died in February 1912. That year, he served as vice chairman of the Democratic National Committee.

Secretary of the Treasury

Woodrow Wilson lured McAdoo away from business after their meeting in 1910, and he worked for the Wilson presidential campaign in 1912. Once he was President, Wilson appointed McAdoo secretary of the Treasury, a post McAdoo held from 1913 to 1918.

He married the president's daughter Eleanor Randolph Wilson at the White House on May 7, 1914. They had two daughters, Ellen Wilson McAdoo (1915–1946) and Mary Faith McAdoo (1920–1988). Ellen married twice and had two children. Mary married three times, but had no children. McAdoo's second marriage ended in divorce in July 1935, and he married a third time at nearly 72, to 26 year old nurse Doris Isabel Cross (1909-2005), in September 1935.

McAdoo offered to resign after his wedding, but President Wilson urged him to complete his work of turning the Federal Reserve System into an operational central bank. The legislation establishing the System had been passed by Congress in December 1913.

As head of the Department of the Treasury, McAdoo confronted a major financial crisis on the eve and at the outbreak of World War I, in July and August 1914. At the time, the United States was still a net debtor nation (i.e., Americans' aggregate debt to foreigners was greater than foreigners' aggregate debt to Americans). The nations of Europe and their financial institutions held far more in debt of the United States, of many of the states of the Union, and of American private institutions of all kinds; than investors in the United States held in the debt of Europe's nations and institutions in all forms, both public and private. During the last week of July 1914, British and French investors began to liquidate their American securities holdings into U.S. currency. Many of these foreign investors then converted their dollars into gold, as was common practice in international monetary transactions at the time, in order to repatriate their holdings back to Europe. If continued, these actions would have depleted the gold backing for the dollar, possibly inducing a depression in American financial markets and in the American economy as a whole. Investors might then have been able to buy American goods and raw materials (for their war effort) at greatly depressed prices, which Americans would have had to accept in order to restart the economy from a consciously (albeit inadvertently) caused depression.

McAdoo's actions, then, were both bold and outrageous: keeping the U.S. currency on the gold standard, he arranged the closing of the New York Stock Exchange for an unprecedented four months to prevent Europeans from selling American securities and exchanging the proceeds for dollars and gold.

Investors in the warring countries thus had no access to their holdings of U.S. financial assets at the outset of the war. As a result, the treasuries of those countries more quickly exhausted all of their net foreign exchange holdings (those that were on hand and in their possession before McAdoo closed the markets), currency, and gold reserves. Some of them then issued sovereign bonded indebtedness (IOUs) to pay for the war materials they were buying on the American and other markets.

Economist William L. Silber wrote that the wisdom and historical impact of this action cannot be overemphasized. McAdoo's bold stroke, Silber writes, averted an immediate panic and collapse of the American financial and stock markets. It also laid the groundwork for a historic and decisive shift in the global balance of economic power, from Europe to the United States; a shift which occurred exactly at that time. More than this, McAdoo's actions both saved the American economy and its future allies from economic defeat in the early stages of the war.

Silber wrote that the intact and undamaged American financial system and its markets managed the flow and operation of this financing more easily than they would have without McAdoo's measures, and that U.S. industry swiftly built up to the scale needed to meet the allied war needs. The managed liquidation of foreign holdings of U.S. assets moved the United States to a net creditor position internationally and with Europe from the net debtor position it had held prior to 1915.

In order to prevent a replay of the bank suspensions that plagued America during the Panic of 1907, McAdoo also invoked the emergency-currency provisions of the 1908 Aldrich–Vreeland Act. Silber credits his actions for having turned America into a world financial power, in his book When Washington Shut Down Wall Street.

Like President Wilson, McAdoo was a segregationist. During his tenure as Secretary, he broke with long-standing policy and ordered implementation of Jim Crow in all Treasury facilities, even in the north where they had previously not existed. McAdoo told reporter Oswald Garrison Villard that racial segregation was needed in the Treasury to prevent friction.

Later political career

After the United States entered World War I in April 1917, the United States Railroad Administration was formed to run America's transportation system during the war. McAdoo was appointed Director General of Railroads, a position he held until the armistice in November 1918.

In March 1919, after leaving the Wilson cabinet, McAdoo co-founded the law firm McAdoo, Cotton & Franklin, now known as white shoe firm Cahill Gordon & Reindel. His law firm served as general counsel for the founders of United Artists, with McAdoo taking a 20 percent stake in the common shares of the joint venture, while founders Mary Pickford, Charlie Chaplin, Douglas Fairbanks and D. W. Griffith each held a 25 percent stake in the preferred shares and a 20 percent stake of the common shares. He left the firm in 1922 and moved to California to concentrate on his political career.

1920 and 1924 campaigns for President
McAdoo ran twice for the Democratic nomination for president, losing to James M. Cox in 1920, and to John W. Davis in 1924, even though in both years he led on the first ballot. While campaigning in the run-up to the 1920 presidential election, McAdoo voiced his support for such measures as injury compensation, unemployment insurance, and the eight-hour workday, while also expressing his support for the idea of permanent federal legislation in the labor sphere, especially concerning unemployment compensation and a minimum wage.

A committed Prohibition supporter, McAdoo's first presidential bid was scuttled by the New York state delegation and other Northern opponents of the banning of alcohol at the 1920 Democratic National Convention. After defeating his chief rival for the nomination, Attorney General A. Mitchell Palmer, McAdoo finally lost the party nomination to dark horse candidate Governor James M. Cox of Ohio when the delegates decided in his favor on the 44th ballot.

McAdoo was again a candidate for the Democratic presidential nomination in 1924. Widely regarded as the front-runner in 1923, McAdoo's candidacy was badly hurt by the revelation that he had previously accepted a $25,000 contribution from Edward L. Doheny, an oil tycoon implicated in 1922 in the Teapot Dome scandal. McAdoo had returned the normal-course contribution once he learned of Doheny's possible bribes to Secretary of the Interior Albert Bacon Fall to get oil leases. At the 1924 Democratic National Convention, McAdoo received the support of the Ku Klux Klan. He refused to answer questions on if he was a member of the KKK and he did not repudiate the KKK causing the Catholic vote to turn against him. McAdoo defeated Oscar Underwood, who was an opponent of the Ku Klux Klan and Prohibition, in the Georgia primary and split the Alabama delegation. McAdoo led after the first ballot of the convention, and on dozens of ballots thereafter, before John W. Davis won the Democratic presidential nomination on the 103rd ballot.

U.S. Senator from California: 1933–1938
He served as Senator for California from 1933 until 1938, having lost his bid for renomination in 1938 to Sheridan H. Downey. McAdoo's wife filed for divorce in 1934. Two months after their decree was finalized in July 1935, the 71-year-old McAdoo married Doris Isabel Cross, a 26-year-old nurse.

Death 

McAdoo died on February 1, 1941, of a heart attack while traveling in Washington, D.C., after the third inauguration of Franklin D. Roosevelt, and was buried in Arlington National Cemetery in Virginia.

Legacy
McAdoo was enormously appealing with his handsome looks, obvious enthusiasm and boundless energy. He had an uncomplex personality that was always persuasive, optimistic and self-assured. What was lacking was depth or commitment to deep principles. 

He excelled first as a maverick promoter and businessman who supported antitrust measures that were favored by the progressive movement. The World War enormously enlarged his scope of Treasury Department activities, giving him a strong voice in all major foreign and domestic policies, with major impact on the entire economy. 

In the 1920s, as his Democratic Party polarized, he took the side of rural America, especially the South, as opposed to Al Smith's big cities. He never supported the Ku Klux Klan, but on the other hand refused to denounce it when so many loyal Democrats belonged. McAdoo and Smith stalemated each other in the fierce competition for the 1924 presidential nomination. 

In 1932, he helped stop Al Smith and instead promoted Franklin Roosevelt for the nomination. He supported the New Deal, but he was no longer comfortable with the growing radicalism in California in the mid-1930s, and was defeated for reelection in 1938.

McAdoo was played by Vincent Price in the 1944 biopic Wilson. He is a significant character in the Glen David Gold novel Sunnyside, encouraging Charlie Chaplin to help with efforts to raise funds for World War I before advising him on the formation of United Artists. McAdoo's former home in Chattanooga's Fort Wood neighborhood has been restored and is now a private residence.

The town of McAdoo in Dickens County, Texas, is named for him. McAdoo's Seafood Company, a restaurant in New Braunfels, Texas, also bears his name.

McAdoo is quoted as having said, "It is impossible to defeat an ignorant man in an argument." And in reference to Warren Harding, McAdoo said his public utterances were "an army of pompous phrases moving over the landscape in search of an idea."

Selected works
 William G. McAdoo, The Challenge. New York: Century Co., 1928.
 William G. McAdoo, Crowded Years: The Reminiscences of William G. McAdoo. Boston: Houghton Mifflin Company, 1931.
 Craig, Douglas B. Progressives at War: William G. McAdoo and Newton D. Baker, 1863–1941. Baltimore: Johns Hopkins University Press, 2013.

See also
 List of railroad executives

Footnotes

Further reading
 Broesamle, John J. William Gibbs McAdoo: A Passion for Change, 1863–1917.  Port Washington, NY: Kennikat Press, 1973.
 Chase, Philip M. William Gibbs McAdoo: The Last Progressive,(1863–1941) (PhD dissertation, University of Southern California, 2008) online
 Craig, Douglas B. Progressives at War: William G. McAdoo and Newton D. Baker, 1863–1941. Baltimore: Johns Hopkins University Press, 2013.
 
 
 
 Schwarz, Jordan A. The New Dealers: Power politics in the age of Roosevelt (Vintage, 2011) pp 3-31. online

 Synon, Mary. McAdoo, the Man and His Times: A Panorama in Democracy. Indianapolis: Bobbs-Merrill Co., 1924.

External links

 Who's Who: William Gibbs McAdoo
 William Gibbs McAdoo via Tennessee Historical Society
 Speeches by William Gibbs McAdoo via Library of Congress
 
 Wm. G. McAdoo's Birthplace historical marker

|-

|-

|-

1863 births
1941 deaths
20th-century American politicians
American Episcopalians
20th-century American railroad executives
People from Marietta, Georgia
Politicians from Chattanooga, Tennessee
Candidates in the 1920 United States presidential election
Candidates in the 1924 United States presidential election
United States Railroad Administration
United States Secretaries of the Treasury
University of Tennessee alumni
Democratic Party United States senators from California
California Democrats
Burials at Arlington National Cemetery
Woodrow Wilson administration cabinet members
Woodrow Wilson family
Progressive Era in the United States
People associated with Cahill Gordon & Reindel
American temperance activists
Progressivism in the United States
People born in the Confederate States